Kanrin Maru  was Japan's first sail and screw-driven steam corvette (the first steam-driven Japanese warship, Kankō Maru, was a side-wheeler). She was ordered in 1853 from the Netherlands, the only Western country with which Japan had diplomatic relations throughout its period of sakoku (seclusion), by the shōguns government, the Bakufu. She was delivered on September 21, 1857 (with the name Japan), by Lt. Willem Huyssen van Kattendijke of the Dutch navy. The ship was used at the newly established Naval School of Nagasaki in order to build up knowledge of Western warship technology.

The ship was built by Fop Smit's in Kinderdijk, the Netherlands later known as L. Smit en Zoon. The virtually identical screw-steamship with schooner-rig Bali of the Dutch navy was also built here in 1856. She allowed Japan to get its first experience with some of the newest advances in ship design.

Japanese embassy to the US

Three years later, the Bakufu sent Kanrin Maru on a mission to the United States, clearly wanting to make a point to the world that Japan had now mastered western navigation techniques and western ship technologies. On 9 February 1860 (18 January in the Japanese calendar), the Kanrin Maru, captained by Katsu Kaishū together with John Manjiro, Fukuzawa Yukichi, and a total of  96 Japanese sailors, and the American officer John M. Brooke, left Uraga for San Francisco.

This became the second official Japanese embassy to cross the Pacific Ocean, around 250 years after the embassy of Hasekura Tsunenaga to Mexico and then Europe in 1614, aboard the Japanese-built galleon .

The official objective of the mission was to send the first ever Japanese embassy to the US, and to ratify the new treaty of Friendship, Commerce, and Navigation between the United States and Japan.

Reclamation of the Bonin Islands
In January 1861, "Kanrin Maru" was dispatched to the Bonin Islands, also known as Ogasawara Islands in Japanese. A navigator aboard the diplomatic mission, Bankichi Matsuoka was sent to survey the islands. The shogunate of Japan first claimed the Pacific islands and its multi-ethnical settler community in the face of competing Western empires. The islands had previously been claimed by Britain, and the United States had considered making them a navy base. The flagship "Kanrin Maru" was put to use in a display of military power reminiscent of the arrival of Commodore Perry's black ships in Japan just a few years earlier.

Boshin war

By the end of 1867, the Bakufu was attacked by pro-imperial forces, initiating the Boshin War which led to the Meiji Restoration. Towards the end of the conflict, in September 1868, after several defeats by the Bakufu, Kanrin Maru was one of the eight modern ships led by Enomoto Takeaki towards the northern part of Japan, in his final attempt to wage a counter-attack against pro-imperial forces.

The fleet encountered a typhoon on its way northward, and Kanrin Maru, having suffered damage, was forced to take refuge in Shimizu harbour, where she was captured by Imperial forces, who bombarded and boarded the ship notwithstanding a white flag of surrender, and put the skeleton crew aboard to the sword.

Enomoto Takeaki finally surrendered in May 1869, and after the end of the conflict, Kanrin Maru was used by the new Imperial government for the development of the northern island of Hokkaido.

She was lost there in a typhoon in 1871, at Esashi.

Kanrin Maru today
In 1990, a ship replica twice the size of the original was ordered for manufacture in the Netherlands, according to the original plans. The ship was visible in the theme park of Huis Ten Bosch in Kyūshū, in southern Japan. It is now used as a sightseeing ship to the Naruto whirlpools from Minami Awaji harbour.

Notes

References
H. Huygens, "Z.M. schroef-schooner Bali," in: Verhandelingen en berigten betrekkelijk het zeewezen en de zeevaartkunde, vol. 17 (1857), pp. 178–183, esp. p. 182
 "Steam, Steel and Shellfire. The steam warship 1815-1905" Conway's History of the ship 
 "The origins of Japanese Trade Supremacy. Development and technology in Asia from 1540 to the Pacific War" Christopher Howe, The University of Chicago Press, 
 "End of the Bakufu and the Restoration at Hakodate" (Japanese 函館の幕末・維新)

External links
 The Kanrin Maru rebuilt
 Naruto whirpool with the Kanrin Maru

 

Bali-class sloops
Screw sloops of the Imperial Japanese Navy
Shipwrecks in the Sea of Japan
1857 ships
Ships of the Tokugawa Navy
Maritime incidents in 1871
Ships built in the Netherlands